Jonny Brown may refer to:
Jonny Brown (cyclist) (born 1997), American cyclist
Jonny Brown, British musician, founder of Twisted Wheel